Whyalla Jenkins is a suburb of the city of Whyalla in South Australia. It was named in 1975 and the boundaries were confirmed in June 2000.

References

Suburbs of Whyalla